Council of Luhansk or Parliament of Luhansk may refer to:
 Luhansk Oblast Council the provincial parliament of the Ukrainian Oblast Luhansk
 People's Council of the Luhansk People's Republic, the regional parliament of the Luhansk People's Republic, an unrecognized republic in the Russian Federation